Snow Falls is a 2023 American horror film directed by Colton Tran and starring Victoria Moroles, Anne Grace Barlow, and John Berchtold. The film's plot follows a group of friends who, while spending New Year's Eve at a remote cabin, struggle to stay sane when they become stranded by a snowstorm.

Snow Falls was released on video-on-demand (VOD) and digital platforms on January 17, 2023.

Cast
 Colton Tran as Kit
 Victoria Moroles as Em
 James Gaisford as Andy
 John Berchtold as River
 Anna Grace Barlow as Eden
 Jonathan Bennett
 Patrick Fabian

Reception
Marco Vito Oddo of Collider gave the film a grade of "D", criticizing a perceived lack of characterization and frightening horror elements, and concluding: "Snow Falls wastes a compelling premise with a dull script, without complex characters or effective scares to elevate the story."

References

External links
 
 

2023 horror films
2023 films
2023 thriller films
American horror films
American thriller films
2023 directorial debut films
Lionsgate films
Films set around New Year